Picquigny is a commune in the Somme department in Hauts-de-France in northern France.

Geography
Picquigny station has rail connections to Amiens and Abbeville.

Population

History
Already established as a Gallic settlement before the Romans arrived, a Gallo-Roman cemetery was discovered in 1895 in the area known as Les Vignes.

Known through the ages by various names, in 942 as Pinquigniacum, Pinconii castrum in 1066 and Pinchiniacum in 1110, then as Pinkeni, Pinkinei and Pecquigny .

After the defeat of the Huns at Lihons-en-Santerre, the inhabitants of Amiens, who had helped the barbarians, took refuge in the castle of Picquigny, to hide from the  vengeance of Dagobert, where they were then besieged by him.

On 17 December 942, Arnulf I, Count of Flanders and William I, Duke of Normandy came to Picquigny to sign a peace treaty. They met on a small island in the Somme, having both left their armies behind. After the meeting, William left but was then assassinated by Arnulf's supporters.

As early as the 14th century, the town had commune status and a county judge.  In 1307, several Templars, were arrested and imprisoned in the dungeons of the château by order of Philip IV of France,

On 29 August 1475, with the Treaty of Picquigny, Louis XI brought to an end the Hundred Years' War. The French king had to pay King Edward IV an annual sum of fifty thousand crowns.

In 1547, Henry II of France established a market, on every second Monday of the month.

Main sights
 Château de Picquigny: Built around the beginning of the 11th century and rebuilt over the following centuries. It was severely damaged during World War I. The vestiges are still picturesque and imposing, nevertheless. Outside of the ramparts, there are other medieval buildings : a prison, a kitchen, two cellars, latrines and the Pavillon Sévigné.

 The church: Originally the chapel to the château, is found behind the ruins of the old chateau, inside the ramparts. The roof was destroyed in a fire at the start of the 20th century.

Notable people
Patriarch Warmund of Jerusalem, Crusader Latin Patriarch of Jerusalem during the early 12th century.

See also
Communes of the Somme department

References

Communes of Somme (department)